Two Hands may refer to:

 Two Hands (1999 film), a 1999 Australian crime film starring Heath Ledger

 Two Hands: The Leon Fleisher Story, a 2006 short documentary about a pianist
 "Two Hands" (song), by Jars of Clay
 "Two Hands", a song by King Crimson on the album Beat
 Two Hands winery in the Barossa Valley, South Australia
 Two Hands (Turbowolf album), a 2015 album by Turbowolf
 Two Hands (Big Thief album), a 2019 album by Big Thief
 Two Hands Corn Dogs, a restaurant chain

See also
 Hand